Jacques Cinq-Mars Born: 1941/42 (died 27 November 2021, aged 79) was a Canadian archaeologist specializing in Canada, especially Yukon. Cinq-Mars excavated the Bluefish Caves site in the Old Crow area from 1977 to 1987. His careful research showed the presence of humans in the Americas long before Clovis. His dates for the site are around 24,000 BP. Cinq-Mars began his work in the Old Crow area early in the 1970s.  Although the Clovis-first hypothesis has substantially fallen out of favor, some  archaeologists question the 24,000 BP date for human presence at Blue Fish Caves.

He was on the staff of the Canadian Museum of History.

He is survived by his widow Andrée Favre, and his two sons, Marc and Eric Cinq-Mars.

Selected publications
 Cinq-Mars, Jaques. 1979. “Bluefish Cave I: A Late Pleistocene Western Beringian Cave Deposit in the Northern Yukon,” Canadian Journal of Archaeology 3: 1–32.
Morlan, Richard E., and Jacques Cinq-Mars. 1983. “Ancient Beringians: Human Occupations in the Late Pleistocene of Alaska and the Yukon Territory,” pp. 53–382 in The Paleoecology of Beringia, edited by D. M. Hopkins, J. V. Mathews, C. E. Schweger, and S. B. Young. Academic Press: New York.
 Cinq-Mars J. and Morlan RE.  1999.  "Bluefish Caves and Old Crow Basin: A New Rapport," pp. 200–212 in Ice Age Peoples of North America Environments, Origins, and Adaptations of the First Americans, edited by R. Bonnichsen and K. L. Turnmire.  Center for the Study of the First Americans. Oregon State University Press.

References 

Year of birth missing
Place of birth missing
1940s births
2021 deaths
Canadian archaeologists